Las Flores (Spanish for "The Flowers") is an unincorporated census-designated place (CDP) in Orange County, California, located adjacent to the City of Rancho Santa Margarita, California. The population was 5,971 at the 2010 census, up from 5,625 at the 2000 census. Las Flores does not have its own ZIP Code and is served by the same ZIP Code as adjacent Rancho Santa Margarita.
The Rancho Santa Margarita dog/skate park is located in the CDP and is served by the Orange County Sheriff's Dept. and Orange County Fire Authority.

Geography
Las Flores is located near the intersection of Oso Parkway and Antonio Parkway in unincorporated southern Orange County, running several miles adjacent to Antonio Parkway and Oso Parkway.

Demographics

2010
At the 2010 census Las Flores had a population of 5,971. The racial makeup of Las Flores was 4,488 (75.2%) White (64.6% Non-Hispanic White), 91 (1.5%) African American, 23 (0.4%) Native American, 780 (13.1%) Asian, 12 (0.2%) Pacific Islander, 261 (4.4%) from other races, and 316 (5.3%) from two or more races. Hispanic or Latino of any race were 984 people (16.5%).

The whole population lived in households, no one lived in non-institutionalized group quarters and no one was institutionalized.

There were 1,916 households, 1,079 (56.3%) had children under the age of 18 living in them, 1,279 (66.8%) were opposite-sex married couples living together, 198 (10.3%) had a female householder with no husband present, 76 (4.0%) had a male householder with no wife present.  There were 84 (4.4%) unmarried opposite-sex partnerships, and 12 (0.6%) same-sex married couples or partnerships. 257 households (13.4%) were one person and 27 (1.4%) had someone living alone who was 65 or older. The average household size was 3.12.  There were 1,553 families (81.1% of households); the average family size was 3.47.

The age distribution was 2,029 people (34.0%) under the age of 18, 418 people (7.0%) aged 18 to 24, 1,885 people (31.6%) aged 25 to 44, 1,416 people (23.7%) aged 45 to 64, and 223 people (3.7%) who were 65 or older.  The median age was 33.2 years. For every 100 females, there were 99.4 males.  For every 100 females age 18 and over, there were 93.0 males.

There were 1,969 housing units at an average density of 970.7 per square mile, of the occupied units 1,326 (69.2%) were owner-occupied and 590 (30.8%) were rented. The homeowner vacancy rate was 0.7%; the rental vacancy rate was 5.6%.  4,469 people (74.8% of the population) lived in owner-occupied housing units and 1,502 people (25.2%) lived in rental housing units.

According to the 2010 United States Census, Las Flores had a median household income of $128,301, with 3.6% of the population living below the federal poverty line.

2000
At the 2000 census there were 5,625 people, 1,936 households, and 1,486 families in the CDP. The population density was 2,816.0 inhabitants per square mile (1,085.9/km). The racial makeup of the CDP was 78.17% White, 1.88% African American, 0.46% Native American, 10.22% Asian, 0.09% Pacific Islander, 4.21% from other races, and 4.96% from two or more races. Hispanic, of any race were 11.88%.

Of the 1,936 households 51.8% had children under the age of 18 living with them, 67.9% were married couples living together, 6.7% had a female householder with no husband present, and 23.2% were non-families. 14.7% of households were one person and 0.7% were one person aged 65 or older.  The average household size was 2.91 and the average family size was 3.31.

The age distribution was 32.4% under the age of 18, 5.9% from 18 to 24, 46.7% from 25 to 44, 12.4% from 45 to 64, and 2.5% 65 or older.  The median age was 30 years. For every 100 females, there were 99.3 males.  For every 100 females age 18 and over, there were 95.5 males.

The median household income was $89,978 and the median family income  was $100,448. Males had a median income of $70,397 versus $46,029 for females. The per capita income for the CDP was $38,241.  About 0.3% of families and 1.1% of the population were below the poverty line, including 0.8% of those under age 18 and none of those age 65 or over.

Served by Rancho Santa Margarita's zip code 92688. It is named in reference to Rancho Santa Margarita y Las Flores. It was established when Rancho Santa Margarita was unincorporated in the 1990s and was never officially annexed when RSM incorporated in 2000.

Government

Education
The CDP is served by Capistrano Unified School District.

Las Flores is the home to the adjoined campuses of Las Flores Elementary and Las Flores Middle School, as well as Tesoro High School.

See also

References

Census-designated places in Orange County, California
Census-designated places in California